Dobrica Matković (29 November 1887 – 9 October 1973) was a Serbian veteran of the World War I and a politician. Appointed as head of the Department for State Protection in 1929, he served as governor of the Danube Banovina between 1933–35, and governor of the Morava Banovina between 1935–36.

Born in Gornji Milanovac, Kingdom of Serbia, Matković served in the Serbian army during World War I. He retreated through Albania with the army. 

He died long after the end of the wars and was buried in Savinac. His descendants still live in Serbia and in France.

See also
 Miloš Obrenović I, Prince of Serbia 
 Danube Banovina

References

1887 births
1973 deaths
20th-century Serbian people
Serbian politicians
Serbian military personnel of World War I
Royal Serbian Army soldiers
People from Gornji Milanovac
People of the Kingdom of Yugoslavia
Yugoslav politicians
Bans of the Kingdom of Yugoslavia
Burials at Serbian Orthodox monasteries and churches